Sin Song-hui (born 24 March 1970) is a North Korean archer. She competed in the women's individual and team events at the 1992 Summer Olympics.

References

1970 births
Living people
North Korean female archers
Olympic archers of North Korea
Archers at the 1992 Summer Olympics
Place of birth missing (living people)